Pineywoods cattle are a rare breed landrace of cattle introduced to the southeastern United States in the early 16th century by Spanish explorers.

See also
 Cattle
 Dairy farming
 Factory farming
 List of cattle breeds

References

External links

 Pineywoods Cattle Registry & Breeders Association
 Picture of a Texas Pineywoods Cow, Barrington Living History Farm Washington-on-the-Brazos State Historic Site, Texas : .

Cattle breeds
Cattle breeds originating in the United States
Conservation Priority Breeds of the Livestock Conservancy
Cattle landraces